The 2017–18 Croatian Second Football League (also known as Druga HNL and 2. HNL) was the 27th season of the Croatian Second Football League, the second level football competition for men's association football teams in Croatia, since its establishment in 1992. The season started on 18 August 2017 and ended on 23 May 2018.

The league is contested by twelve teams and played in a triple round robin format, with each team playing every other team three times over 33 rounds.

Teams
On 21 April 2017, Croatian Football Federation announced that the first stage of licensing procedure for 2016–17 season was completed. For the 2017–18 Druga HNL,  eight clubs outside of top level were issued a second level license: Rudeš, Solin, Gorica, Dinamo Zagreb II, Dugopolje. In the second stage of licensing procedure clubs that were not licensed in the first round appealed the decision. On 23 May 2017, all remaining Druga HNL were granted second division license, along with third level clubs Kustošija, Hajduk Split II, Varaždin and Trnje.

Stadia and locations

Number of teams by county

League table

Results

Matches 1–22

Matches 23–33

Relegation play-offs
At the end of the season, eleventh placed team Hrvatski Dragovoljac was to contest a two-legged relegation play-off tie against RNK Split, runners-up of the 2017–18 Croatian Third Football League South Division. The matches, however, were not played because RNK Split did not receive a licence for Druga HNL.

First leg

Second leg

Top scorers

See also
2017–18 Croatian Football Cup
2017–18 Croatian First Football League

References

External links
Official website  

2017-18
Cro
2